Thomas Costelloe (born 1931) was an Irish Gaelic footballer who played for club side Duagh and at inter-county level with the Kerry senior football team.

Career

Costelloe first came to prominence as a Gaelic footballer with the Duagh club. After making a number of National League appearances for the Kerry senior football team, he won an All-Ireland Junior Championship title in 1954. This victory saw Costelloe drafted onto the senior team for the 1955 Munster Championship. He won a provincial championship medal that year before ending the season with an All-Ireland title after a defeat of Dublin in the final. Costelloe ended his career by winning a league title in 1959.

Honours

Kerry
All-Ireland Senior Football Championship: 1955
Leinster Senior Football Championship: 1955
National Football League: 1958-59
All-Ireland Junior Football Championship: 1954
Munster Junior Football Championship: 1954

References

External links
Tom Costelloe profile at the Terrace Talk website

1931 births
Living people
Irish farmers
Kerry inter-county Gaelic footballers